Ramón Ángel Díaz (born 29 August 1959) is a former Argentine footballer and the current manager of Saudi Professional League club Al Hilal. He played for River Plate as a striker, and coached it for three tenures, winning eight titles. He is also known by the nickname of El Pelado ("Baldy").

Club career
Díaz was born in the city of La Rioja in the province of the same name. He played as a forward and starred in River Plate's youth system under Norberto "El Pacha" Yacono. His opening game in the Argentine First Division was on 13 August 1978, a game where River Plate beat Colón de Santa Fe by 1–0. He scored his first goal on 30 August of that year, playing against Quilmes Atlético Club. Diaz went on to feature for clubs such as River Plate, Inter Milan, Yokohama Marinos, and Monaco under famed manager Arsène Wenger.

International career

Ramón Díaz was on the Argentina under-20 team that won the 1979 FIFA World Youth Championship, alongside Diego Maradona. Díaz and Maradona were the core of the attack-minded team, and together scored 14 of the team's 20 goals (70%). Díaz scored 8 goals, winning the Golden Boot for being the top scorer of the competition. Maradona scored 6 goals, winning the Best Player award.

Ramón Díaz then went on to play in the 1982 FIFA World Cup and scored against Brazil in Argentina's 3–1 defeat. It had been rumoured that he and Maradona were involved in a feud which prevented Diaz from playing for Argentina in the 1986 and 1990 World Cups. However, this was denied by Maradona in his autobiography Yo soy el Diego, claiming that he had told the then-Argentina manager, Carlos Bilardo, that he wanted Diaz in both the 1986 and 1990 World Cup squads.

Managerial career
Díaz served as the manager of River Plate between 1995 and 2003, in that time he guided the club to victory in the 1996 Copa Libertadores as well as collecting five league titles and the Supercopa Sudamericana.

Oxford United
Ramón Díaz served as manager of League Two English club Oxford United between 2004 and 2005, despite already having achieved considerable success in his native Argentina. At the time, Diaz told the media: "I like English football and I wanted to get first-hand experience of it...I'd seen plenty of it on television... It's also very interesting to work at this level, because it's completely different from football at the top." It was also claimed that neither Diaz nor any of his five backroom staff were being paid by Oxford United for their services.

San Lorenzo 1st Term
On 24 December 2006, he was appointed head coach of San Lorenzo in the Argentine Primera, Díaz secured the title after the 17th round of fixtures, with two games still to play. Díaz led them to the Clausura 2007 championship title, the club's first title in six years.

Club América
On 15 May 2008, Diaz was confirmed as the new Club América coach. Although the club did not reveal specific details about Diaz' contract, he was reportedly offered 1.5 million dollars per year including performance-related bonuses which could have taken his total earnings to 6 million dollars. Díaz failed to make Club América qualify to Copa Libertadores. In the start of the Clausura 2009 season, Díaz won against Santos 2–1. After that, Díaz drew against Toluca 2-2. Díaz lost against Morelia 1–0. Díaz lost again against Pachuca 3–1. After two consecutive league losses, and the club being in 12th position in the league table, Club América sacked coach Ramón Díaz on Tuesday 10 February 2009.

San Lorenzo 2nd Term
On 25 May 2010, it was made official by President Savino that Ramón Díaz was appointed for the second time. Díaz had a one-year contract with San Lorenzo. Ramón Díaz resigned because of poor results and said there is no turning back. In addition, he said that this has nothing to do with Abdo: "I thank the president because he gave me everything, just like the players."

Independiente
On 12 September 2011, Independiente hired Díaz to replace Antonio Mohamed who resigned. On 5 March 2012, Ramón Díaz quit Independiente, resigning from his position at the King of Cups, who had been struggling and found themselves at the very bottom of the table. Ramón Díaz was replaced by Christian Díaz.

River Plate 3rd term
On 30 November 2012, Ramón Díaz was appointed coach of River Plate for the third time in his management career. Ramón won the Toreno Final in 2014, and he also won the Superfinal against San Lorenzo 1–0. On 27 May 2014, Díaz left River Plate.

Paraguay National Team

On 5 December 2014, Ramón left River Plate to become the manager of the Paraguay national team. He said "It's one of the biggest challenges of my career... There's a lot of work to do". Ramón first major competition was the 2015 Copa América. His first match in the Copa América was against Argentina which they drew 2-2. Ramón's second match was against Jamaica which they won 1–0. The last match of the group stages was against Uruguay which they drew 1-1. Paraguay finished 2nd with five points in their group. Paraguay won the quarterfinal against Brazil 1-1 (3-4 on penalties). Paraguay were hammered 6-1 by Argentina in the Semifinals which let them go to the third group playoff which they lost 2–0 against Peru which made Paraguay fourth in the Copa América. Ramón continued in the national team. On the Copa América Centenario, Paraguay were out of the competition in the group stage, by drawing against Costa Rica and losing to Colombia 2-1 and the US 1–0. On 12 June 2016, following an unsuccessful run at Copa América Centenario, he resigned as manager of Paraguay.

Al-Hilal

On 13 October 2016 Ramón Díaz was appointed manager of Al-Hilal FC after former manager Gustavo Matosas was sacked with a one-year contract.

2016/17 Season
Ramón's first match was against Al-Fateh SC where Al-Hilal won 1–0. On 25 November, Rámon played his first important match against Al-Ahli where they won 2–1. Ramón drew the Riyadh Derby against Al-Nassr FC 1-1. Ramón won 4–2 against Al-Taawon FC. He won against Ittihad FC 3–1. Ramón Diaz drew 0–0 against Al-Ahli, but he won against Al-Shabab 2–1 to Secure the title. Al-Hilal lifted the league against Al-Nassr in the Riyadh Derby after winning 5–1 in the league. Ramón Díaz renewed his contract for one more year for 1.5 million dollars. Ramón made Al-Hilal first in the Champions League group stages after winning against Al-Rayyan 4–3. Ramón made Al-Hilal qualify to the King's Cup final after beating Al-Taawon 3–4. Ramón Díaz won the King's Cup against Al-Ahli in final 3–2. Rámon Díaz won the Champions League Round of 16 first leg against Esteghlal Khuzestan F.C. 2–1. Díaz won the second leg 2-1 again [2-4 on AGG] making Al-Hilal go to the Quarterfinals of the AFC Champions League.

2017/18 Season
On 4 June, Díaz signed Mukhtar Fallatah to make him the first signing of the season. On 19 June 2017, Ramòn Díaz made Omar Kharbin a permanent signing after he was on loan, the fee 11 million dollars (44 million riyals) and signed a four-year contract with Al-Hilal. On 21 June, Díaz signed Ali Al Bulaihi for free from Al-Fateh. On 3 July, Al-Hilal signed Mohamed Kanno and Hasan Kadish from Ettifaq.

On 10 August, Díaz won the first match of the season 2–1 against league debutant Al-Fayha. On 15 August, Ramón Díaz won his second match of the season which was against Al-Taawoun 4–3. On 21 August, Díaz made Al-Hilal draw against Al Ain 0–0 in the 2017 AFC Champions League quarter finals.

On 11 September, Díaz made Al-Hilal qualify to the semi final of the AFC Champions League after beating Al-Ain 3–0. After that, he signed Gelmin Rivas to become his sixth registered foreigner player in the 2017–18 season. On 16 September, Ramón Díaz won the third match of season against Ohod 1–0. On 21 September, Al-Hilal drew against Al-Ittihad 1-1. On 26 October, Diaz made Al-Hilal won the Riyadh Derby against Al-Nassr.
On 18 November, Diaz and his team drew in the first leg of the final of the AFC Champions League against Urawa 1–1 in Riyadh. On 25 November, they lost the second 1-0 making them runners-up in the tournament. On 1 December, Diaz led his team to win against title challengers Al-Ahli 2–0. On 17 December, Diaz and his team lost their first match in the league against Al-Fayha 2–1. After that, Diaz won against Ohod 4–1. On 20 January, Al-Hilal were kicked out of the Kings Cup by Al-Qadisyah in the round of 16. On 13 February, Al-Hilal drew their first match in their new stadium the King Saud University Stadium against Al-Ain 0–0 in the Champions League. On 20 February, Al-Hilal lost 1–0 against Esteghlal in Oman. On 21 February, Al-Hilal sacked Ramon Diaz due to unsatisfactory performances.

Botafogo
On 8 November 2020, Díaz was named manager of Série A side Botafogo. He subsequently returned to his home country to make an emergency surgery to remove a tumor, and his absence was prolonged due to his clinical condition.

On 27 November 2020, Botafogo announced the departure of Díaz and his staff from the club. He left the club without managing a single match for them, as the three matches played by them during the period (all losses) were managed by his assistant and son Emiliano Díaz.

Al Nasr
In February 2021, he agreed to a contract with Al Nasr to last until the summer of 2022.

Return to Al Hilal 
On 14 February 2022, Díaz was named as the new coach of Saudi Professional League club Al Hilal until the end of the season.

Career statistics

Club

International

Managerial statistics

Honours

Player
River Plate
 Primera División Argentina: 1979 Metropolitano, 1979 Nacional, 1980 Metropolitano, 1981 Nacional, 1991 Apertura

Internazionale
 Serie A: 1988–89

Monaco
 Coupe de France: 1990–91

Argentina U20
 FIFA World Youth Championship: 1979

Individual
 FIFA World Youth Championship Golden Boot: 1979
 Primera División Argentina Top Scorer: 1991 Apertura
 J.League Top Scorer: 1993
 J.League Best XI: 1993

Manager
River Plate
 Primera División Argentina: 1996 Apertura, 1997 Clausura, 1997 Apertura, 1999 Apertura, 2002 Clausura, 2014 Final
 Superfinal: 2013–14
 Copa Libertadores: 1996
 Supercopa Libertadores: 1997

San Lorenzo
 Primera División Argentina: 2007 Clausura

Al-Hilal
 Saudi Professional League: 2016–17, 2021–22
 King's Cup: 2017

Individual
 Saudi Professional League Manager of the Month: March 2022, May & June 2022

Notes

References

External links

 

Ramón Díaz at Footballdatabase
 Ramón Díaz Interview

1959 births
Living people
Sportspeople from La Rioja Province, Argentina
Argentine footballers
Association football forwards
Club Atlético River Plate footballers
S.S.C. Napoli players
U.S. Avellino 1912 players
ACF Fiorentina players
Inter Milan players
AS Monaco FC players
Yokohama F. Marinos players
Argentine Primera División players
Serie A players
Ligue 1 players
J1 League players
Argentine expatriate footballers
Argentine expatriate sportspeople in Italy
Argentine expatriate sportspeople in Monaco
Argentine expatriate sportspeople in Japan
Expatriate footballers in Italy
Expatriate footballers in Monaco
Expatriate footballers in Japan
Argentina youth international footballers
Argentina under-20 international footballers
Argentina international footballers
1982 FIFA World Cup players
Argentine football managers
Club Atlético River Plate managers
Oxford United F.C. managers
San Lorenzo de Almagro managers
Club América managers
Club Atlético Independiente managers
Paraguay national football team managers
Al Hilal SFC managers
Ittihad FC managers
Pyramids FC managers
Club Libertad managers
Botafogo de Futebol e Regatas managers
Al-Nasr SC (Dubai) managers
Argentine Primera División managers
English Football League managers
Liga MX managers
Saudi Professional League managers
Egyptian Premier League managers
Paraguayan Primera División managers
Campeonato Brasileiro Série A managers
UAE Pro League managers
2015 Copa América managers
Copa América Centenario managers
Argentine expatriate football managers
Argentine expatriate sportspeople in England
Argentine expatriate sportspeople in Mexico
Argentine expatriate sportspeople in Paraguay
Argentine expatriate sportspeople in Saudi Arabia
Argentine expatriate sportspeople in Egypt
Argentine expatriate sportspeople in Brazil
Argentine expatriate sportspeople in the United Arab Emirates
Expatriate football managers in England
Expatriate football managers in Mexico
Expatriate football managers in Paraguay
Expatriate football managers in Saudi Arabia
Expatriate football managers in Egypt
Expatriate football managers in Brazil
Expatriate football managers in the United Arab Emirates